Cyrano de Bergerac is a 1974 videotaped television production of Edmond Rostand's famous 1897 play about the lovestruck swordsman with the long nose. This production was originally staged by American Conservatory Theater and shown on PBS as part of the Theater in America series. It uses Brian Hooker's 1923 translation of the play (with some uncredited revisions), and stars Peter Donat as Cyrano, Marsha Mason as Roxane, Marc Singer as Christian de Neuvillette, and Paul Shenar as the Comte de Guise. Kathryn Grant (wife of Bing Crosby) has a brief role as Lise, the unfaithful wife of pastry cook Ragueneau – a role cut in some productions of the play because of its brevity.

The production is available on DVD. Some prints of this seem to be in black and white, but the production was originally made and shown (on PBS) in color. The DVD release is in color.

Plot summary

Cast
 Peter Donat as Cyrano de Bergerac
 Charles Hallahan as Montfleury / Cadet
 John Hancock as Cut Purse
 Marsha Mason as Roxane
 Robert Mooney as Ragueneau
 E. Kerrigan Prescott as Chavigny
 Paul Shenar as De Guiche
 Howard Sherman as Jodelet / Cadet
 Marc Singer as Christian de Neuvillette

References

External links
 

1974 films
Films based on Cyrano de Bergerac (play)
American television films
Filmed stage productions
1970s English-language films